Stephen Paul Trapilo (September 20, 1964 – May 21, 2004) was a professional American football Guard in the National Football League. He attended Boston College. He played with the New Orleans Saints from 1987 to 1990, and again in 1992. 

Trapilo died of a heart attack on May 21, 2004, while on vacation with his family in Effingham, New Hampshire.

External links
Pro-Football reference
"Then and Now: Steve Trapilo" Scout.com
Stephen P. Trapilo, BC football star, volunteer; at 39

1964 births
2004 deaths
American football offensive guards
Boston College Eagles football players
Boston College High School alumni
New Orleans Saints players
Players of American football from Boston